Gundlander is part of the SD Gundam franchise, a subfranchise of the popular Gundam anime.

The series has a fantasy setting with characters designed to resemble monsters and is mainly merchandised in Bandai's Gashapon line.

Outline
With Musha Gundam having a Japan Sengoku setting and Knight Gundam having a middle age Europe setting, Gunlander is something different as it has a prehistoric, ancient civilization setting.

Similarly, with Knight Gundam developing from Carddas and Musha Gundam developing plastic model kits, Gundlander choose the capsule toy Gashapon Senshi as a development platform. The series has transformation and combination gimmicks, technologies that were passed on to future Gashapon figures.

But the series was not popular as the story has a complex constitution and is difficult to understand. A portion of the manga has not been published in takubon. Similarly to its other two counterparts, the characters are portrayed as living beings not robots.

A single BB Senshi model kit was produced from the line, depicting the character of Superior Lander.

Series list
Gundlander :Revelations of Darkness (1990)
Gundlander :Saint sword that seals demons (1991)
Gundlander III: Guardian of the Dragon (1992)
Gundlander IV: Revival of the Seiyusha (1993)

See also
 Musha Gundam
 Knight Gundam
 SD Command Senki

SD Gundam